Na Svatém Kopečku is a 1934 Czechoslovak musical comedy film, directed by Miroslav Cikán. It stars  Jaroslav Vojta, Marie Grossová, and Jiřina Steimarová.

Cast
Jaroslav Vojta as Holeček, farmer
Marie Grossová as Mája Malínská
Jiřina Steimarová as Heda
Valentin Šindler as Matej Krópal from Brochovany
Rudolf Lampa 		
Světla Svozilová as Běta
Ladislav Pešek 			
Jindřich Plachta as Jakub
Zdeňka Baldová as Králová
Václav Trégl as Portýr
Jaroslav Bráška 	
Josef Kotalík 	 		
Bohumil Mottl

References

External links
Na Svatém Kopečku at the Internet Movie Database

1934 films
Czechoslovak musical comedy films
1934 musical comedy films
Films directed by Miroslav Cikán
Czech musical comedy films
Czechoslovak black-and-white films
1930s Czech films